Stikkaåsen is a village in Sarpsborg municipality, Norway, located northwest of Sarpsborg city. Its population is 285. Before 1992, Stikkaåsen was a part of Tune municipality.

References

Villages in Østfold
Sarpsborg